In control theory, a control-Lyapunov function (CLF) is an extension of the idea of Lyapunov function  to systems with control inputs. The ordinary Lyapunov function is used to test whether a dynamical system is (Lyapunov) stable or (more restrictively) asymptotically stable. Lyapunov stability means that if the system starts in a state  in some domain D, then the state will remain in D for all time. A control-Lyapunov function is used to test whether a system is asymptotically stabilizable, that is whether for any state x there exists a control  such that the system can be brought to the zero state asymptotically by applying the control u.

The theory and application of control-Lyapunov functions were developed by Zvi Artstein and Eduardo D. Sontag in the 1980s and 1990s.

Definition

Consider an autonomous dynamical system with inputs

Suppose our goal is to drive the system to an equilibrium  from every initial state in some domain .

Definition. A control-Lyapunov function (CLF) is a function  that is continuously differentiable, positive-definite (that is,  is positive for all  except at  where it is zero), and such that for all  there exists  such that 

The last condition is the key condition; in words it says that for each state x we can find a control u that will reduce the "energy" V. Intuitively, if in each state we can always find a way to reduce the energy, we should eventually be able to bring the energy asymptotically to zero, that is to bring the system to a stop.  This is made rigorous by Artstein's theorem.

Some results apply only to control-affine systems—i.e., control systems in the following form:

Theorems

E. D. Sontag showed that for a given control system, there exists a continuous CLF if and only if the origin is asymptotic stabilizable. It was later shown by Francis H. Clarke that every asymptotically controllable system can be stabilized by a (generally discontinuous) feedback.
Artstein proved that the dynamical system has a differentiable control-Lyapunov function if and only if there exists a regular stabilizing feedback u(x).

Constructing the Stabilizing Input 
It is often difficult to find a control-Lyapunov function for a given system, but if one is found, then the feedback stabilization problem simplifies considerably. For the control affine system, Sontag's formula (or Sontag's universal formula) gives the feedback law  directly in terms of the derivatives of the CLF. In the special case of a single input system , Sontag's formula is written as

For the general nonlinear system, the input  can be found by solving a static non-linear programming problem

for each state x.

Example
Here is a characteristic example of applying a Lyapunov candidate function to a control problem.

Consider the non-linear system, which is a mass-spring-damper system with spring hardening and position dependent mass described by

Now given the desired state, and actual state, with error, define a function  as

A Control-Lyapunov candidate is then

which is positive definite for all , .

Now taking the time derivative of 

The goal is to get the time derivative to be

which is globally exponentially stable if  is globally positive definite (which it is).

to fulfill the requirement

which upon substitution of the dynamics, gives

Solving for  yields the control law

This control law will guarantee global exponential stability since upon substitution into the time derivative yields, as expected

which is a linear first order differential equation which has solution

And hence the error and error rate, remembering that , exponentially decay to zero.

This is left as an exercise for the reader but the first few steps at the solution are:

which can then be solved using any linear differential equation methods.

References

See also
 Artstein's theorem
 Lyapunov optimization
 Drift plus penalty

Stability theory